Mount Amana (a-mā'na, a-mä'na, uh-may'nuh) is an ancient name for the southern Anti-Lebanon Mountains.

Geography 
Mount Amana is at the southern end of the Anti-Lebanon Mountains, near the source of the river Abana. Paul Haupt identifies this mountain as Jabal az-Zabadany, northwest of Damascus.

Mount Amana is often confused with Mount Amanus, also known as Mount Hor, at the north end of the Syrian plain.

Notable mentions 
Mount Amana is mentioned in Song of Songs (4:8) along with Lebanon, Senir, and Mount Hermon. Senir, Mount Hermon, and Amana are all prominent mountains on the northern end of Israel in the Anti-Lebanon Mountains. In this era, Lebanon referred to both the Lebanese Mountains and the Anti-Lebanese mountains without referring to any particular peak. A targum on this verse reads "They that dwell on the river Amana shall offer thee a gift."

The "mountains of Sanir and Amana" are also mentioned in the Book of Jubilees as lying within the inheritance of Shem (8:21), or more specifically, Arpachshad (9:4).

Winckler was the first scholar to suggest that the Mount Ammananu referred to in the inscriptions of Tiglath-pileser III should be understood as identical with Amanah, a claim which has been confirmed by more recent scholarship.

Tacitus records that a triumphal arch was erected on Mount Amana (possibly Mount Amanus) in honor of Germanicus after his death.

Amana River
This river flows through Damascus and is currently known as the Barada.

Meanings 
The name Amana means "constant", "firm", "faith", "truth", "credulity", or "a nurse".

Notes

References

Sources 

 
 
 
 
 
 
 
 
 
 
 
 
 
 
 
 
 
 
 

Hebrew Bible mountains
Geography of Israel
Geography of Lebanon
Book of Jubilees